The Maxwell Award is presented annually to the college football player judged by a panel of sportscasters, sportswriters, and National Collegiate Athletic Association head coaches and the membership of the Maxwell Football Club to be the best all-around in the United States. The award is named after Robert "Tiny" Maxwell, a Swarthmore College football player, coach, and sportswriter. Johnny Lattner (1952, 1953) and Tim Tebow (2007, 2008) are the only players to have won the award twice. It is the college equivalent of the Bert Bell Award of the National Football League, also given out by the Maxwell Club.

Winners

References
General
 
 

Footnotes

College football national player awards
Awards established in 1937